Lipsett may refer to:

 Lipsett, Irish surname, and people with that surname
 Lipsett Hardware Building, Pickford, Michigan, United States
 Lipsett Diaries (French: Les journaux de Lipsett), 2010 documentary